Saket Burman (born 1976/77) is a British billionaire.

Burman has a bachelor's degree in marketing and finance from the University of Wisconsin–Madison. He is the son of Sidharth Burman, who died in 2015, when he inherited a 12.4% stake in Dabur, the Indian consumer goods company. His mother is Indira Burman.

Burman is a director and vice-chair of Dabur International.

He has homes in Dubai, London and Delhi.

References

Living people
Wisconsin School of Business alumni
Year of birth uncertain
1970s births